Nekisa Cooper (born 1977 or 1978) is an American film producer. Cooper is best known for producing the 2011 film Pariah, directed by Dee Rees. Cooper and Rees won the Independent Spirit John Cassavetes Award for Best Film in 2011. Cooper played a large role in marketing Pariah, which centers an African-American lesbian woman, to a wider audience and branding the film as a coming-of-age tale with broad appeal. In 2013, Cooper was awarded the inaugural Fox Film Grant for members of communities traditionally underrepresented in film to pursue creative projects. A graduate of the College of William & Mary, Cooper received an M.B.A. from Clark Atlanta University and worked in marketing for Colgate-Palmolive, L'Oréal, and General Electric before becoming a film producer.

References

College of William & Mary alumni
Clark Atlanta University alumni
American film producers
American women film producers
Living people
1970s births